Cobalt fluoride may refer to:

 Cobalt(II) fluoride (cobalt difluoride), CoF2, red color
 Cobalt(III) fluoride (cobalt trifluoride), CoF3, brown color